The 2012 Indonesia Open Super Series Premier was the fifth super series tournament of the 2012 BWF Super Series. The tournament was held in Jakarta, Indonesia, from 12 to 17 June 2012 and had a total purse of $650,000.

Men's singles

Seeds

  Chen Long (second round)
  Chen Jin (first round)
  Peter Gade (first round)
  Sho Sasaki (first round)
  Lee Hyun-il (second round)
  Kenichi Tago (first round)
  Simon Santoso (winner)
  Du Pengyu (runner-up)

Top half

Bottom half

Finals

Women's singles

Seeds

  Wang Yihan (semifinal)
  Wang Xin (quarterfinal)
  Wang Shixian (quarterfinal)
  Li Xuerui (Runner up)
  Saina Nehwal '(winner)
  Jiang Yanjiao (second round)
  Tine Baun (quarterfinal)
  Juliane Schenk (quarterfinal)

Top half

Bottom half

Finals

Men's doubles

Seeds

  Cai Yun / Fu Haifeng (withdrew)
  Jung Jae-sung / Lee Yong-dae (winner)
  Mathias Boe / Carsten Mogensen (Runner up)
  Ko Sung-hyun / Yoo Yeon-seong (second round)
  Chai Biao / Guo Zhendong (quarterfinal)
  Muhammad Ahsan / Bona Septano (first round)
  Fang Chieh-min / Lee Sheng-mu (first round)
  Koo Kien Keat / Tan Boon Heong (semifinal)

Top half

Bottom half

Finals

Women's doubles

Seeds

  Wang Xiaoli / Yu Yang (champions)
  Tian Qing / Zhao Yunlei (final)
  Ha Jung-eun / Kim Min-jung (withdrew)
  Mizuki Fujii / Reika Kakiiwa (second round)
  Christinna Pedersen / Kamilla Rytter Juhl (first round)
  Shizuka Matsuo / Mami Naito (quarterfinals)
  Jung Kyung-eun / Kim Ha-na (quarterfinals)
  Miyuki Maeda / Satoko Suetsuna (quarterfinals)

Top half

Bottom half

Finals

Mixed doubles

Seeds

  Zhang Nan / Zhao Yunlei (quarterfinal)
  Xu Chen / Ma Jin (semifinal)
  Tantowi Ahmad / Lilyana Natsir (runner-up)
  Joachim Fischer Nielsen / Christinna Pedersen (quarterfinal)
  Chen Hung-ling / Cheng Wen-hsing (first round)
  Thomas Laybourn / Kamilla Rytter Juhl (first round)
  Lee Yong-dae / Ha Jung-eun (withdrew)
  Chan Peng Soon / Goh Liu Ying (second round)

Top half

Bottom half

Finals

References 

Indonesia Super Series Premier
2012 Indonesia Super Series
Indonesia Super Series